Margaret E. Collinson is a paleobotanist at Royal Holloway, University of London, United Kingdom.

Career
Her career has led her to leadership of the Plant Paleobiology Research Group at Royal Holloway, University of London, UK. Her research interests are interdisciplinary and wide-ranging within plant Paleobotany as evidenced by her publications. They particularly include consideration of geochemical signatures of oxygen, biomolecules and other elements; the paleoclimate and floral assemblages; pollen and other tissues; and evolution in ancient plants.

She has been president of the International Organization of Paleobotany, a Foreign Member of the Royal Netherlands Academy of Arts and Sciences (2007), and a corresponding Member of the Senckenberg Gesellschaft für Naturforschung (Germany). In 2015 she was awarded Distinguished Fellow of the Botanical Society of America.

Selected publications
She is the author or co-author of over 180 scientific publications. Among her most significant publications are:

 Gordon N. Inglis, Margaret Collinson et al., (2017) Mid-latitude continental temperatures through the early Eocene in western Europe. Earth and Planetary Science Letters. 460, 15 February 2017, 86-96
 Helen M.Talbot, Juliane Bischoff, Gordon N. Inglis, Margaret E. Collinson, Richard D. Pancost (2016) Polyfunctionalised bio- and geohopanoids in the Eocene Cobham Lignite Organic Geochemistry 96, June 2016, 77-92
 Howard J. Falcon-Lang, Viola Mages and Margaret Collinson (2016) The oldest Pinus and its preservation by fire Geology 44 (4), 303–306.
 Margret Steinthorsdottir, Amanda S. Porter, Aidan Holohan, Lutz Kunzmann, Margaret Collinson, and Jennifer C. McElwain (2016) Fossil plant stomata indicate decreasing atmospheric CO2 prior to the Eocene–Oligocene boundary Climate of the Past, 12 (2), 439–454
 Michael T. Hren), Nathan D. Sheldon, Stephen T.Grimes, Margaret E. Collinson et al., (2013) Terrestrial cooling in Northern Europe during the Eocene-Oligocene transition. Proceedings of the National Academy of Sciences (USA), 110  (19),  7562-7567
 Sarah A. E. Brown, Andrew C. Scott, Ian J. Glasspool and Margaret E. Collinson (2012) Cretaceous wildfires and their impact on the Earth system. Cretaceous Research 36 162-190
 Stephen G. Compton, Alexander D. Ball, Margaret E. Collinson, Peta Hayes, Alexandr P. Rasnitsyn and Andrew J. Ross (2010) Ancient fig wasps indicate at least 34 Myr of stasis in their mutualism with fig trees. Biology Letters 6, 838–842.
 P. L. Ascough, M. I. Bird, A. C. Scott, M. E. Collinson, I. Cohen-Ofri, C. E. Snape and K. Le Manquais (2010) Charcoal reflectance measurements: implications for structural characterization and assessment of diagenetic alteration. Journal of Archaeological Science .37 (7) 1590-1599
 Selena Y. Smith, Margaret E. Collinson, Paula J. Rudall, David A. Simpson, Federica Marone and Marco Stampanonid (2009) Virtual taphonomy using synchrotron tomographic microscopy reveals cryptic features and internal structure of modern and fossil plants. Proceedings of the National Academy of Sciences (USA), 106 (29)   12013-12018 
 Richard D. Pancost, David S. Steart, Luke Handley, Margaret E.  Collinson et al., (2007) Increased terrestrial methane cycling at the Palaeocene-Eocene thermal maximum. Nature 449 (7160) 332-
 Neal S. Gupta, Briggs, Derek E. G. Briggs, Margaret E. Collinson et al., (2007) Evidence for the in situ polymerisation of labile aliphatic organic compounds during the preservation of fossil leaves: Implications for organic matter preservation. Organic Geochemistry, 38 (3), 499-522

References 

Year of birth missing (living people)
Living people
Academics of Royal Holloway, University of London
Paleobotanists
21st-century British botanists
20th-century British botanists
20th-century British women scientists
British palaeontologists
British women botanists
Women paleontologists
21st-century British women scientists
Members of the Royal Netherlands Academy of Arts and Sciences